Brazil and Ukraine are strategic partners and cooperate in trade, space technology, education, energy, healthcare, and defense. Brazil recognized Ukraine's independence on December 26, 1991, and bilateral relations were established on February 11, 1992. The development of a joint space industry had strengthened the bilateral ties between the two countries. Ukraine considers Brazil its key trade partner in Latin America and has been a vocal supporter of the Brazilian bid for a permanent seat at the United Nations Security Council.

Brazil has the third largest Ukrainian population outside of the former Soviet Union, with approximately 500,000 Ukrainian descendants.

Country comparison

History

Brazil recognized Ukraine's independence on December 26, 1991. Bilateral relations were established two months later on February 11, 1992. However, high level dialogue would begin in October 1995, when President Leonid Kuchma made the first official visit of a President of Ukraine to Brazil. During that visit, Kuchma proposed that both countries could cooperate in the aerospace sector. Ukraine could supply Brazil with advanced missile technology while Brazil offered a cheap launch site for rocket tests. President Fernando Henrique Cardoso repaid the visit in January 2002, becoming the first Brazilian President to visit Ukraine.

Bilateral contacts significantly increased after the inauguration of President Luiz Inácio Lula da Silva of Brazil. In September 2003, the presidents of Ukraine and Brazil met in New York, during the 58th session of the United Nations General Assembly. The state-level dialogue continued with the official visits of the President of Ukraine to Brazil in October 2003, and of the President of Brazil to Ukraine in 2004. Bilateral dialogue at the highest level was again pursued in September 2005 within the framework of participation of the Presidents of Ukraine and Brazil in the activities of 60th session of the United Nations General Assembly.

In November 2008, the Secretary of Strategic Affairs of the Presidency of Brazil, Roberto Mangabeira Unger, made an important visit to Ukraine. The visit paved way for the signing of several important bilateral agreements in the fields of defense and space technology.

A major boost to the development of bilateral cooperation was the meeting of the two presidents within the 64th session of the United Nations General Assembly in New York on September 22, 2009. During this meeting, both presidents agreed to establish working groups in order to prepare for the visit of President Lula da Silva to Ukraine, which was successfully held in December 2009. This visit marked an important step in the strengthening of bilateral relations – it established the strategic partnership between the two countries. Agreements in the fields of aircraft manufacturing, defense, technology, space exploration and nuclear energy, followed.

In April 2011, Ukrainian Prime Minister Mykola Azarov met with the President of Brazil, Dilma Rousseff, in Sanya. The two discussed a wide range of topics on the bilateral agenda, in particular the progress of the Ukrainian-Brazilian space project "Alcântara Cyclone Space". Mykola Azarov and Dilma Rousseff also talked about the 120th anniversary of the Ukrainian immigration to Brazil.

The President of Ukraine, Viktor Yanukovych, made a state visit to Brazil on October 25, 2011. During the occasion, the Ukrainian and Brazilian governments issued a joint statement outlining areas of cooperation for the subsequent years, with the aim of further elevating the bilateral partnership.

On 27 February 2022, during the Russian invasion of Ukraine, Brazilian President Jair Bolsonaro criticized Ukrainian President Volodymyr Zelenskyy and stated that Brazil would "adopt a neutral stance on Ukraine", would not impose sanctions on Russia, and that Ukrainians had "trusted a comedian with the fate of a nation". On 2 March, Brazil approved of UN General assembly resolution ES-11/1 demanding a full withdrawal of Russian forces.

Trade and investment

Trade

Resident diplomatic missions
 Brazil has an embassy in Kyiv.
 Ukraine has an embassy in Brasília and a consulate-general in Rio de Janeiro and a consulate in Curitiba.

See also
 Ukrainian Brazilians

References

 
Ukraine
Bilateral relations of Ukraine